
A medical condition is a broad term that includes all diseases and disorders.

A disease is an abnormal condition affecting the body of an organism.

A disorder is a functional abnormality or disturbance.

 List of cancer types
 List of cutaneous conditions
 List of endocrine diseases
 List of eye diseases and disorders
 List of intestinal diseases
 List of infectious diseases
 List of human disease case fatality rates
 List of notifiable diseases - diseases that should be reported to public health services, e.g., hospitals.
 Lists of diseases by year of discovery

Disorders
 List of communication disorders
 List of genetic disorders
 List of neurological disorders
 List of voice disorders
 List of vulvovaginal disorders
 List of liver disorders
 List of heart disorders
 Mental illness (alphabetical list)
 List of eating disorders
 List of mood disorders
 List of personality disorders

See also
 :Category:Diseases and disorders
 :Category:Lists of diseases
 List of disorders
 List of syndromes
 List of abbreviations for diseases and disorders
 List of fictional diseases, diseases found only in works of fiction. 
 Airborne disease, a disease that spreads through the air.
 Contagious disease, a subset of infectious diseases.
 Cryptogenic disease, a disease whose cause is currently unknown.
 Disseminated disease, a disease that is spread throughout the body.
 Environmental disease
 Lifestyle disease, a disease caused largely by lifestyle choices.
 Localized disease, a disease affecting one body part or area.
 Non-communicable disease, a disease that can't be spread between people.
 Organic disease
 Progressive disease, a disease that gets worse over time.
 Rare disease, a disease that affects very few people.
 Systemic disease, a disease affecting the whole body.
 :Category:Animal diseases
 :Category:Lists of plant diseases

External links
List from Health on the Net Foundation, available in several languages
 List from National Institutes of Health
List from Orphanet (change the last two letters of the link to choose your language: ES, DE, ...)
List from Biomedical Entity Network (http://crn.vistainformatics.com)